, also known as "MTJ", was a Japanese game designer and artist.

Mitsuji is best known for his work at Taito, where he created popular arcade platform game Bubble Bobble and its follow-up Rainbow Islands. He later ran a game design school, and worked freelance creating games such as Magical Puzzle Popils for Game Gear.

According to reports from Japanese Bubble Bobble forums, Mitsuji passed away on the 11th of December, 2008, at the age of 48. The cause was attributed to cardiopulmonary arrest caused by kidney problems.

List of confirmed works

List of other works

References

External links
Fukio Mitsuji interviewed by CVG
 from Taito Legends compilation

1960 births
2008 deaths
Japanese video game designers
Taito people